In enzymology, divinyl chlorophyllide a 8-vinyl-reductase is an enzyme that catalyzes the chemical reaction

3,8-divinylprotochlorophyllide + NADPH + H+  protochlorophyllide + NADP+

The three substrates of this enzyme are 3,8-divinylprotochlorophyllide, NADPH, and H+; its two products are protochlorophyllide and NADP+. This enzyme can also convert alternative substrates, for example 3,8-divinyl chlorophyllide a and in all cases reduces a single specific vinyl group to an ethyl group.

This enzyme belongs to the family of oxidoreductases.  The systematic name of this enzyme class is chlorophyllide-a :NADP+ oxidoreductase. Other names in common use include 3,8-divinyl protochlorophyllide a 8-vinyl-reductase, [4-vinyl]chlorophyllide a reductase, and 4VCR.  This enzyme is part of the biosynthetic pathway to chlorophylls.

See also
 Biosynthesis of chlorophylls

References

 
 
 
 
 
 </ref>

EC 1.3.1
NADPH-dependent enzymes
Enzymes of unknown structure